Fifteen American scholars and artists, including one woman and one Black man, were awarded Guggenheim Fellowships in 1925. This was the inaugural year of this award and was given by the John Simon Guggenheim Memorial Foundation. Composer Aaron Copland was the only recipient not to have a college degree.

Fellows

See also
 Guggenheim Fellowship
 List of Guggenheim Fellowships awarded in 1926

References

1925
1925 awards